Vladimir Pavlovich Barmin (in Moscow – 17 July 1993 in Moscow) was a Russian engineer and the designer of the first soviet rocket launch complexes in the Soviet space program.

An asteroid, 22254 Vladbarmin, was named in his honor.

Honours and awards
 Hero of Socialist Labour (1956)
 Lenin Prize (1957)
 Stalin Prize (1943)
 USSR State Prize, three times (1967, 1977, 1985)
 Six Orders of Lenin
 Order of the October Revolution
 Order of Kutuzov 1st class
 Order of the Red Banner of Labour, twice
 Jubilee Medal "In Commemoration of the 100th Anniversary of the Birth of Vladimir Ilyich Lenin"
 Medal "In Commemoration of the 800th Anniversary of Moscow"

Further reading 
 J. K. Golovanov, M., "Korolev: Facts and myths", Nauka, 1994, ;
 "Rockets and people" – B. E. Chertok, M: "mechanical engineering", 1999.  ;
 A. I. Ostashev, Sergey Pavlovich Korolyov - The Genius of the 20th Century — 2010 M. of Public Educational Institution of Higher Professional Training MGUL .
 "Bank of the Universe" - edited by Boltenko A. C., Kyiv, 2014., publishing house "Phoenix", .
 "S. P. Korolev. Encyclopedia of life and creativity" - edited by C. A. Lopota, RSC Energia. S. P. Korolev, 2014 .
 "I look back and have no regrets. " - Author: Abramov, Anatoly Petrovich: publisher "New format" Barnaul, 2022. 

1909 births
1993 deaths
20th-century Russian engineers
Writers from Moscow
Bauman Moscow State Technical University alumni
Academic staff of Bauman Moscow State Technical University
Full Members of the Russian Academy of Sciences
Full Members of the USSR Academy of Sciences
Heroes of Socialist Labour
Stalin Prize winners
Lenin Prize winners
Recipients of the Order of Kutuzov, 1st class
Recipients of the Order of Lenin
Recipients of the Order of the Red Banner of Labour
Recipients of the USSR State Prize
Aviation inventors
Early spaceflight scientists
Russian aerospace engineers
Russian inventors
Russian mechanical engineers
Soviet aerospace engineers
Soviet mechanical engineers
Soviet scientists
Soviet space program personnel

Burials at Novodevichy Cemetery